Enrica Clay Dillon (June 22, 1885 – October 9, 1946) was an American opera singer, opera director, and voice teacher.

Life and career
Born in 1885 in Denver, Colorado, Dillon was the daughter of Judge Henry Clay Dillon and Florence (née Hood) Dillon. She was the older sister of composer Fanny Dillon  and actress Josephine Dillon; the latter of whom was married to Clark Gable for 6 years. Dillon studied voice at Mount Holyoke College and with baritone Francesco Mottino in Milan. She had a prolific career as a dramatic soprano in Europe during the first decade and a half of the 20th century, giving more than 1,800 opera performances. She was especially active in Italy and sang at most of the principle houses in that country, including La Scala. She was particularly known for her portrayal of the title role in Giuseppe Verdi's Aida.

Dillon abandoned her singing career shortly before the outbreak of World War I; largely due to continual bouts with illness. She then served as the first director of the Washington Opera Company from 1919 to 1927. She moved to Philadelphia in 1927, where for three years she taught singing and was director of the Philadelphia Operatic Society. From 1930-35, she worked for Herbert Witherspoon as a vocal coach and stage director at first the Chicago Civic Opera and then the Chicago Grand Opera Company. She also maintained a home in New York City during the 1930s where she had a voice studio and directed operas for the New York Singing Teachers Association and the New York Opera Guild.

Beginning in 1916, Dillon spent her summers in the state of Maine where she ran an opera and voice training program for aspiring singers at Frederick Bristol's music camp just outside Harrison, Maine. Her regular students from Washington D.C., Philadelphia, and New York City would often come up with her to study at the school. Among her notable pupils were Richard Crooks, Marie Sundelius, Kathryn Meisle, and Frederick Jagel, and musical theatre actress Evelyn Herbert.

In 1936, Dillon founded the Deertrees Theatre in Harrison, which was later the home of Dillon's Deertree Opera Company (DOC). The DOC presented its first season in 1940. Many theatres were closed down during World War II, and the opera company only presented three seasons of performances before the theatre was closed in 1942. Metropolitan Opera conductor Karl Kritz served as the company's music director and primary conductor. Hermann Weigert also served on the company's conducting staff. Notable singers to have performed with the company included a young Astrid Varnay just prior to her triumphant Met debut and soprano Elisabeth Carron in her professional opera debut.

Death
At the time of her death in Harrison, Maine, Dillon was in the midst of organizing a summer opera festival to be held in July 1947, after already presenting a summer opera festival in 1946, at the re-opened Deertree Theatre.

References

1885 births
1946 deaths
American operatic sopranos
Mount Holyoke College alumni
American opera directors
Female opera directors
Singers from Denver
Voice teachers
20th-century American singers
20th-century American women singers
Women music educators